The Boggeragh Mountains are located in County Cork, Ireland, with the Munster Blackwater to the north and the River Lee to the south of the hills. The landscape consists of peat blanket bog, grassland, streams and areas of forestry. The mountains were formed from Old Red Sandstone deposited during the Devonian Period. They were shaped by glacial erosion during the last glacial period.

Construction of a wind farm in the area started in September 2009. In February 2010 19 units of Vestas V90-3MW MW wind turbines are up and running.

References

Mountains and hills of County Cork